RAAF Overseas Headquarters was a Royal Australian Air Force (RAAF) administrative unit established in London during World War II.

Under Article XV of the Ottawa Agreement, signed in 1939, the Australian government agreed to form RAAF squadrons for service within British Royal Air Force (RAF) operational commands.

RAAF Overseas Headquarters was formed on 1 December 1941 to oversee the welfare of RAAF personnel posted to:
 the so-called "Article XV squadrons";
 other RAAF units serving in Europe and the Mediterranean and;
 RAAF personnel attached to units of the RAF and other British Commonwealth air forces.

The headquarters replaced the Air Liaison Office, which had been run out of the High Commission of Australia, London. The new agency was not assigned any subordinate units.

RAAF Overseas Headquarters was disbanded on 19 July 1959.

See also
RCAF Overseas Headquarters
Second Australian Imperial Force in the United Kingdom

References
Notes

Bibliography

Military units and formations of the Royal Australian Air Force in World War II
Military units and formations established in 1941
Australia–United Kingdom relations